Ophiclinus antarcticus, the Adelaide snake blenny (or Dusky snake blenny), is a species of clinid found in the coastal waters of southern Australia. It can reach a maximum length of  TL. It often has dark blotches and speckles on its body and fins, with a series of large white blotches along the midside, dorsal-fin base and just above the anal-fin base. It also has several dark stripes that often radiate from its eyes and dark brown markings on the lips and lower side of the head.

References

External links
Photograph

antarcticus
Fish described in 1872
Taxa named by François-Louis Laporte, comte de Castelnau